Jan Evangelista Plichta (13 September 1891 – 31 January 1975) was a Czechoslovak racewalker. He competed in the men's 10 kilometres walk at the 1924 Summer Olympics.

References

External links
 

1891 births
1975 deaths
Athletes (track and field) at the 1924 Summer Olympics
Czechoslovak male racewalkers
Olympic athletes of Czechoslovakia
Place of birth missing